Zhaozhou may refer to:

Zhaozhou Congshen (趙州從諗; 778–897), Chinese Chán (Zen) Buddhist master
Zhaozhou County (肇州县), Heilongjiang, China
Zhaozhou, Heilongjiang (肇州镇), town in and seat of Zhaozhou County
Zhao County (赵州), formerly named Zhaozhou, in Hebei, China
Zhaozhou Bridge (赵州桥), world's oldest open-spandrel fully stone segmental arch bridge, in Zhao County
Zhaozhou, Hebei (赵州镇), town in and seat of Zhao County

See also
Chaozhou
Teochew (disambiguation)
 Joushuu (disambiguation)